Todd Russ (born January 8, 1961) is an American politician who has served as the Treasurer of Oklahoma since 2023. He previously served in the Oklahoma House of Representatives representing the 55th district from 2009 to 2022. He was term limited from the Oklahoma Legislature in 2022.

Career
He was first elected in a 2009 special election after Ryan McMullen resigned for a federal agricultural position. He was the first Republican to represent the district.

In January 2022, Russ announced his campaign for Oklahoma state treasurer. He won the November general election and is the Oklahoma State Treasurer elect in 2022.

Electoral History

2006

2009

2010, 2012, and 2014 
Russ ran unopposed for re-election.

2016

2018

2020

2022

References

1961 births
21st-century American politicians
Living people
Republican Party members of the Oklahoma House of Representatives
People from Washita County, Oklahoma
State treasurers of Oklahoma